Benki Birugali may refer to:
 Benki Birugali (2013 film), an Indian Kannada action comedy film
 Benki Birugali (1984 film), an Indian Kannada film